Peter Gordon Duthie (born 16 April 1959) is a Scottish chief executive and former cricketer.

Duthie was born at Greenock in April 1959. A club cricketer for Greenock Cricket Club, Duthie made his debut for Scotland in a List A one-day match against Essex at Chelmsford in the 1984 NatWest Trophy. He was a regular in the Scottish eleven in one-day cricket from 1984 to 1994, making 29 appearances across the Benson & Hedges Cup and the NatWest Trophy. In his 29 one-day matches, he scored 163 runs with a highest score of 33. With his right-arm medium pace bowling, he took 27 wickets at an average of 41.77, with best figures of 3 for 31. In addition to playing one-day cricket for Scotland, Duthie also made five appearances in first-class cricket against Ireland from 1984 to 1991, scoring 122 runs at an average of 24.40, recording one half century, a score of 54 not out. With the ball, he took 11 wickets at an average of 40.72, with best figures of 3 for 99.

Duthie began employment with the Scottish Exhibition Centre (SEC) in 1984 and became a member of its senior management team in 1991. He was appointed chief executive of the SEC in 2014. He resides in Kilmacolm and is married with two daughters.

References

External links
 

1959 births
Living people
Sportspeople from Greenock
Scottish cricketers
Scottish chief executives